The Lililan Cup (Gvia Lililan), which was also known as The League Cup (Gvia HaLiga) was an Israeli men's football competition open to the top 4 clubs in Liga Leumit between 1981–82 and 1988–89. The competition was contested at the start of each football season. It was cancelled after the 1989 tournament.

History
The competition was established in 1982, as a season opening tournament, and was named after Yehuda Lilian, a former IFA treasurer and Hapoel member, who died in February 1982. 

Parallel to this competition the IFA also held the Israel Super Cup, which was played at the end of the season, and the Toto Cup, which was played throughout the season, mostly on weekdays.

Due to dwindling interest in the competition, and the preference to give more weight to hold most of the Toto Cup matches before the beginning of the league season, the cup was cancelled in 1989.

Format
The format of the competition varied during its years between a straight knock-out competition, held in two match days, and between a preliminary group, played as a single round-robin tournament, followed by a third place match and final.

Results

1. Third place match wasn't played.

Source:

Performance by club

References
100 Years of Football 1906-2006, Elisha Shohat (Israel), 2006 
 Official Tournaments – Maccabi Haifa 

predecessors
Football competitions in Israel